Félix Auger-Aliassime and Denis Shapovalov were the defending champions, however Shapovalov withdrew due to injury. Auger-Aliassime played alongside Benjamin Sigouin, but lost in the final to Juan Carlos Aguilar and Felipe Meligeni Alves, 3–6, 6–7(4–7).

Seeds

Draw

Finals

Top half

Bottom half

External links 
 Main draw

Boys' Doubles
US Open, 2016 Boys' Doubles